Sam Chui (born 7 November 1980) is a Chinese-born Australian aviation and travel vlogger, photographer, and author. He has written four books including Air1, Air2, Air 3, and Air747. Chui is also a YouTube content creator. He is considered to be one of the world's most popular aviation bloggers and airline reviewers.

Early life 
Sam Chui was born on 7 November 1980 in Beijing, China. When he was a child, his parents moved to Hong Kong. As a teenager, Chui often visited Kai Tak Airport (Hong Kong's old airport) and watched planes land and take off.

Career 

In 1999, Chui started a website, publishing photos of aircraft. It has since expanded to include current events regarding aviation. He is known for overhead pictures of Los Angeles International Airport captured from helicopters. In 2007, he started his YouTube channel and became well-known. Some of his videos gathered an excess of 60 million views. Chui has traveled to over 100 countries and flown over 2,000 flights. He travels more than 300,000 miles every year to test out flights and share his reviews.

In 2019, Chui was invited onto a Boeing 747-SP private jet owned previously by the Qatari Royal Family and he flew from Hamilton, Canada, to Marana, Arizona as the only passenger. In 2019, he flew to Rome on an El Al Israel Airlines Boeing 747.

Chui has a keen interest for the Boeing 747. He has logged over a million miles on 279 747 flights and has flown on every commercial variant of the 747 across 37 operators from around the world. His first flight on a Boeing 747 was in 1993 onboard United Airlines Flight 800 from Hong Kong to Tokyo Narita. Chui has flown on 240 airlines and 180 aircraft types. He has flown New York to London on Concorde, landed on a glacier in New Zealand, visited Lukla in Nepal and taken the longest non-stop flight from Singapore to Newark. He was the sole passenger aboard the world’s only privately-owned Boeing 787 Dreamliner. Chui received his Private Pilot License in the USA in July 2021.

He has also worked for the National Business Aviation Association (NBAA) to publish highlights from the 2021 NBAA Business Aviation Convention & Exhibition (NBAA-BACE).

Books

References

External links 
 
 
 

1980 births
Living people
Chinese bloggers
Australian bloggers
Australian expatriates in the United Arab Emirates
Chinese YouTubers
Australian YouTubers
Chinese emigrants to Australia